Enthroned Madonna Adoring the Sleeping Christ Child is a 1475 tempera on panel painting by Giovanni Bellini, now in the Gallerie dell'Accademia in Venice, which acquired it in 1812.

References 

Paintings of the Madonna and Child by Giovanni Bellini
1475 paintings
Paintings in the Gallerie dell'Accademia